In linear algebra, a Toeplitz matrix or diagonal-constant matrix, named after Otto Toeplitz, is a matrix in which each descending diagonal from left to right is constant. For instance, the following matrix is a Toeplitz matrix:

Any n × n matrix A of the form

is a Toeplitz matrix. If the i, j element of A is denoted Ai, j then we have

A Toeplitz matrix is not necessarily square.

Solving a Toeplitz system
A matrix equation of the form

is called a Toeplitz system if A is a Toeplitz matrix.  If A is an n × n Toeplitz matrix, then the system has only 2n − 1 unique values, rather than n2. We might therefore expect that the solution of a Toeplitz system would be easier, and indeed that is the case.

Toeplitz systems can be solved by the Levinson algorithm in O(n2) time.  Variants of this algorithm have been shown to be weakly stable (i.e. they exhibit numerical stability for well-conditioned linear systems).  The algorithm can also be used to find the determinant of a Toeplitz matrix in O(n2) time.

A Toeplitz matrix can also be decomposed (i.e. factored) in O(n2) time.  The Bareiss algorithm  for an LU decomposition is stable.  An LU decomposition gives a quick method for solving a Toeplitz system, and also for computing the determinant.

Algorithms that are asymptotically faster than those of Bareiss and Levinson have been described in the literature, but their accuracy cannot be relied upon.

General properties
 An n × n Toeplitz matrix may be defined as a matrix A where Ai, j = ci−j, for constants c1−n, ..., cn−1. The set of n × n Toeplitz matrices is a subspace of the vector space of n × n matrices (under matrix addition and scalar multiplication).
 Two Toeplitz matrices may be added in O(n) time (by storing only one value of each diagonal) and multiplied in O(n2) time.
 Toeplitz matrices are persymmetric.  Symmetric Toeplitz matrices are both centrosymmetric and bisymmetric.
 Toeplitz matrices are also closely connected with Fourier series, because the multiplication operator by a trigonometric polynomial, compressed to a finite-dimensional space, can be represented by such a matrix. Similarly, one can represent linear convolution as multiplication by a Toeplitz matrix.
 Toeplitz matrices commute asymptotically. This means they diagonalize in the same basis when the row and column dimension tends to infinity.

 For symmetric Toeplitz matrices, there is the decomposition

 The inverse of a nonsingular symmetric Toeplitz matrix has the representation

Discrete convolution 
The convolution operation can be constructed as a matrix multiplication, where one of the inputs is converted into a Toeplitz matrix.

 

This approach can be extended to compute autocorrelation, cross-correlation, moving average etc.

Infinite Toeplitz matrix

The induced operator is bounded if and only if the coefficients of the Toeplitz matrix  are the Fourier coefficients of some essentially bounded function .

In such cases,  is called the symbol of the Toeplitz matrix , and the spectral norm of the Toeplitz matrix  coincides with the  norm of its symbol. The proof is easy to establish and can be found as Theorem 1.1 of:

See also

 Circulant matrix, a square Toeplitz matrix with the additional property that 
 Hankel matrix, an "upside down" (i.e., row-reversed) Toeplitz matrix

Notes

References

Further reading

Golub G. H., van Loan C. F. (1996), Matrix Computations (Johns Hopkins University Press) §4.7—Toeplitz and Related Systems
Gray R. M., Toeplitz and Circulant Matrices: A Review (Now Publishers) 

Matrices